La Virgencita de Pompeya is a 1935 Argentine musical film drama directed by Enrique Cadícamo and written by Enrique Pedro Maroni. It is a tango film and premiered on 14 March 1935 in Buenos Aires.

Main cast
Juan Carlos Cobián
Luis Díaz
Santos Landa
Enrique Pedro Maroni
Inés Murray
Nelly Quel

External links
 

1935 films
1930s Spanish-language films
Argentine black-and-white films
1935 romantic drama films
Films directed by Enrique Cadícamo
1930s romantic musical films
1930s musical drama films
Argentine romantic musical films
Argentine musical drama films
Argentine romantic drama films
1930s Argentine films